The following is a list of current and former county-maintained roads in Dakota County, Minnesota, United States. County roads in Dakota County vary from multilane suburban arterials to improved roads. Many of the routes included are also county state aid highways (CSAH.) In addition, portions of County Road 23, County Road 32, and County Road 42 are components of the National Highway System.

Route list

See also 
 County Roads in Minnesota
 County Road 42 (Minnesota)

References 

 a Scott County Road Map
 a Rice County Road Map
 a Goodhue County Road Map
 Google Maps (County 70)
 

 
Dakota